The Yellow Back is a 1926 American silent Western film directed by Del Andrews and produced and distributed by Universal Pictures. It was marketed as a Blue Streak Western.

It is preserved in the Library of Congress collection.

Cast
 Fred Humes as Andy Hubbard
 Lotus Thompson as Anne Pendleton
 Claude Payton as Bruce Condon
 Buck Connors as John Pendleton
 Willie Fung as Chinese

References

External links
 
 

1926 films
1926 Western (genre) films
American black-and-white films
Films directed by Del Andrews
Silent American Western (genre) films
1920s American films